Alisa Kleybanova and Anastasia Pavlyuchenkova were the defending champions but decided not to participate.

Spanish couple Nuria Llagostera Vives and Arantxa Parra Santonja won the tournament beating Americans Raquel Kops-Jones and Abigail Spears in the final,
7–6(7–2), 7–6(7–2).

Seeds

Draw

Draw

References
 Main Draw

Brisbane International - Doubles
Women's Doubles